The 2012 Hawaii Senate Elections were held on November 6, 2012. State senators in all 25 districts of the Hawaii Senate were up for election. 9 seats were won in the primary uncontested. No seats changed parties in this election.

Overview 
No seats were lost as a result of the decennial reappropriation of districts. Only 2 incumbent senators were not reelected. District 11 Senator Carol Fukunaga was defeated by fellow Democratic Senator Brian Taniguchi (formerly District 10) in the primary. Pohai Ryan, incumbent District 25 senator, was defeated by Laura Thielen in the primary.

Results

District 1

District 2

District 3

District 4

District 5

District 6

District 7

District 8

District 9

District 10

District 11

District 12

District 13

District 14

District 15

District 16

District 17

District 18

District 19

District 20

District 21

District 22

District 23

District 24

District 25

See also
Hawaii State House of Representatives Elections, 2012
United States Senate election in Hawaii, 2012
United States House of Representatives elections in Hawaii, 2012

References

Senate
Hawaii Senate elections
Hawaii Senate